Between 1864 and 1958, Queensland Railways ordered 47 types of locomotives for purposes such as freight, passenger and mail train use.

Classification
Until 1889, each of the isolated sections of the Queensland Railways adopted its own locomotive numbering system. With the impending joining of most of the sections, in 1890 a new centralised classification system was adopted to eliminate duplications. Locomotives on the Southern & Western Railway retained their existing numbers, with locomotives on other networks renumbered where there was a duplication.

The classification system consisted of a letter, indicating the number of driving axles, followed by a number, indicating the cylinder diameter in inches and factions of inches. This was confusing for two reasons:
it differed from the international system
it could lead to several classes having the same classification number

Where classification numbers were duplicated, the classes were usually distinguished by the name of the builder, e.g. A10 Baldwin, A10 Fairlie, A10 Neilson.

In the case of tank locomotives, the number of wheels was added as prefix, e.g. the 6D16 class had six wheels. When all four wheel tank locomotives, the prefix was dropped, thus the 6D16 class became the D17 class.

Improved versions of a similar class were given a second identical letter. For example, the improved version of the D17 was the DD17.

Classes

References

Australian railway-related lists
Steam locomotives
 
Railway locomotive-related lists